Amphitrema is a genus of testate amoeba in the family Amphitremidae. The genus is commonly found in Sphagnum-dominated peatlands. All species of this genus are mixotrophic and harbor unicellular algae belonging to genus Chlorella.

Species
 ?Amphitrema congolense van Oye 1957
 ?Amphitrema jollyi Van Oye 1956
 ?Amphitrema paparoensis Van Oye 1956
 Amphitrema stenostoma Nusslin 1884
 Amphitrema wrightianum Archer 1869

References

 Gomaa F, Mitchell EAD, Lara E. 2013 Amphitremida (Poche, 1913) is a new major, ubiquitous labyrinthulomycete clade. PLoS ONE 8(1): e53046. doi:10.1371/journal.pone.0053046
 Gomaa F, Kosakyan A, Heger TJ, Corsaro D, Mitchell EAD, Lara E. 2014. One Alga to Rule them All: Unrelated Mixotrophic Testate Amoebae (Amoebozoa, Rhizaria and Stramenopiles) Share the Same Symbiont (Trebouxiophyceae). Protist 165(2): 161-176. doi: /10.1016/j.protis.2014.01.002

External links

Foraminifera genera